Rafael Osuna and Antonio Palafox were the defending champions, but lost in the semifinals to Bob Hewitt and Fred Stolle.

Hewitt and Stolle defeated Roy Emerson and Ken Fletcher in the final, 4–6, 6–2, 6–2, 6–2 to win the gentlemen's doubles tennis title at the 1964 Wimbledon Championship.

Seeds

  Chuck McKinley /  Dennis Ralston (quarterfinals)
  Rafael Osuna /  Antonio Palafox (semifinals)
  Bob Hewitt /  Fred Stolle (champions)
  Roy Emerson /  Ken Fletcher (final)

Draw

Finals

Top half

Section 1

Section 2

Bottom half

Section 3

Section 4

References

External links

Men's Doubles
Wimbledon Championship by year – Men's doubles